Alexander Keith may refer to:

 Alexander Keith (politician) (1795–1873), Canadian politician, freemason and brewer
 Alexander Keith (minister) (1791–1880), Scottish clergyman
 Alexander Keith, Jr. (1827–1875), Canadian mass murderer
 Sandy Keith (Alexander M. Keith, 1928–2020), American politician
 Alexander Keith, 18th-century Church of England clergyman responsible for thousands of clandestine marriages; see Keith's Chapel
 Sir Alexander Keith of Dunnottar, Knight Marischal (died 1819), namesake of the Keith Medal

See also
 Alexander Keith's Brewery, brewery and beer brand
 Keith Alexander (disambiguation)